30 Greatest Hits is a 1985 Aretha Franklin compilation album. The album chronicles majority of Franklin's hit singles during the Atlantic Records era from 1967 up to 1974. Following Franklin's death, the album entered the top ten of the Billboard 200 albums chart at number seven, in the week ending on August 25, 2018 earning 52,000 units with 18,000 of that were traditional sales.  It climbed one spot higher the following week, becoming Franklin's highest-peaking compilation album in the United States.

Track listing
Disc 1
"I Never Loved a Man (The Way I Love You)" 
"Respect"
"Do Right Woman, Do Right Man"
"Dr. Feelgood"
"Save Me"
"Baby I Love You"
"(You Make Me Feel Like) A Natural Woman"
"Chain of Fools"
"(Sweet Sweet Baby) Since You've Been Gone"
"Ain't No Way"
"Think"
"I Say a Little Prayer"
"The House That Jack Built"
"See Saw"
"The Weight"
"Share Your Love with Me"
"Eleanor Rigby"

Disc 2
"Call Me"
"Spirit in the Dark"
"Don't Play That Song (You Lied)"
"You're All I Need to Get By"
"Bridge over Troubled Water"
"Spanish Harlem"
"Rock Steady"
"Oh Me Oh My (I'm a Fool for You Baby)"
"Day Dreaming"
"Wholy Holy"
"Angel"
"Until You Come Back to Me (That's What I'm Gonna Do)"
"I'm in Love"

Charts

Weekly charts

Year-end charts

Certifications

References

1985 compilation albums
Aretha Franklin compilation albums